Xu Xiaoming (born September 14, 1984 in Harbin, Heilongjiang) is an internationally elite curler from China.

Career
His team won bronze in the Curling at the 2007 Asian Winter Games and he competed for China at the 2010 Winter Olympics. In Vancouver he will throw Second stones for the Chinese team. He represented China at the 2014 Winter Olympics as the third for the Chinese team.

Currently as the head coach of Chinese Men's Youth Curling Team, he leads the team to win the first ever men's World Junior Curling Championship in 2023.

Personal life
Xu is married to Kim Ji-sun, the skip of South Korea's women's national team. They have one child.

References

External links

1984 births
Chinese male curlers
Curlers at the 2010 Winter Olympics
Curlers at the 2014 Winter Olympics
Living people
Olympic curlers of China
Sportspeople from Harbin
Asian Games medalists in curling
Curlers at the 2003 Asian Winter Games
Curlers at the 2007 Asian Winter Games
Curlers at the 2017 Asian Winter Games
Medalists at the 2003 Asian Winter Games
Medalists at the 2007 Asian Winter Games
Medalists at the 2017 Asian Winter Games
Asian Games gold medalists for China
Asian Games bronze medalists for China
Universiade medalists in curling
Pacific-Asian curling champions
Universiade bronze medalists for China
Competitors at the 2009 Winter Universiade